The Backyard Committee (BYC) is a band from New Haven, Connecticut that plays melodic roots rock injected with moments of improvisation and experimentation, much in the spirit of the Grateful Dead, Neil Young, and Bob Dylan, but with indie rock influences like Guided By Voices, Pavement, and Neutral Milk Hotel. Mike Sembos (vocals, guitar or bass) writes the songs and then serves as the editor of the project. His rotating cast of musicians are encouraged to play their instruments using their own ideas and their own voices to make each lineup and each show unique.

Sembos formerly played guitar and then bass with The Alternate Routes, a group that has toured the U.S. numerous times, performed on "Late Night with Conan O'Brien" and "Mountain Stage", and played festivals including Gathering of the Vibes and Mountain Jam.

Sembos has studied bass with Carol Kaye of the Wrecking Crew.

The Backyard Committee has shared stages with the likes of The Felice Brothers, Miracle Legion, American Babies, Crooked Fingers, Sean Hayes, Sarah Borges & the Broken Singles, Jesse Malin, The Ryan Montbleau Band, and Califone.

Discography 

 The Backyard Committee (2010)
 Festival (2013)
 Plains (2017)
 Mountains (2017)
 Surf Hotel Ghosts (2020)

Album Reviews 

"Whatever ineffable attributes Sembos brings to the Alternate Routes, there's no mistaking what he has done with the Backyard Committee: He's made an inviting album of songs that linger after the last note fades," says Eric Danton of the Hartford Courant.

"The real joy of this album for me is the production" says John H at CT Indie. "The instrumentation fits the vocals so perfectly it's mind-blowing. The songs have the ethereal undertones of a typical Daniel Lanois production, and still maintain the minimal folk sense of something Rick Rubin would do. Listen to the guitar solo in "Once in a Blue" and you'll find they dialed up just the right amount of crunch for a sharp single-coil pickup. Listening to "So Long Ago" the windy, gritty organ is absolutely perfect, and adds a low layer of ambiance and noise to what would otherwise be a squeaky-clean late era Jeff Tweedy-esque tune. The super low-end tones of piano on "Winter Trip" sound like they'd be right at home on Cash's American IV.

"The end result is a sort of jam-session garage band you’d actually want to sit and listen to–like somewhere in Connecticut is this bunch of musician neighbors that get together for a barbecue or something, and actually sound really, really good," says Jeff McQ of the Oomph Music Blog.

References

Culture of New Haven, Connecticut
Rock music groups from Connecticut
Musical groups established in 2010
Jam bands
2010 establishments in Connecticut